George Throop may refer to:

George Throop (baseball) (born 1950), former Major League Baseball pitcher
George B. Throop (1793–1854), American lawyer and politician from New York and Michigan
George H. Throop (1818–1896), American novelist and educator
George R. Throop (1882–1949), chancellor of Washington University